Ericaella is a genus of spiders in the family Cheiracanthiidae. It was first described in 1994 by Bonaldo. This genus is named after the Brazilian arachnologist Erica Helena Buckup. , it contains 4 species.

References

Cheiracanthiidae
Araneomorphae genera
Spiders of South America